"Get Away" is a song performed and co-written by American singer Bobby Brown, issued as the third single from his third album, Bobby. In 1993, the song peaked at #14 on the Billboard Hot 100, as well as reaching #1 on the Billboard dance chart. It was also Brown's last song to chart on the Top 40 in the United States.

Music video

The official music video for the song was directed by Fatima Robinson.

Charts

Weekly charts

Year-end charts

References

External links
 
 

1992 songs
1993 singles
Bobby Brown songs
MCA Records singles
Music videos directed by Fatima Robinson
Song recordings produced by Teddy Riley
Songs written by Bernard Belle
Songs written by Bobby Brown
Songs written by Tony Haynes
Songs written by Teddy Riley
Songs written by Louis Silas Jr.